The Route of the castles of Vinalopó is a historic and cultural route in Spain, connecting some of the castles of the province of Alicante, Valencian Community, most of them based in the Valley of Vinalopó.

The route, which is located in the Valley of Vinalopó, in the inside mountains of the province of Alicante, unveiled a series of castles and forts that protected them during the Middle Ages, when these populations, at some point in its history, where lands of border between the Kingdom of Valencia and the Kingdom of Castile.

The route has with around 75 kilometres through nine different municipalities. It's located in one of the regions of the Valencian Community and Spain with more concentration of castles, which are in various locations such as Villena, Biar, Banyeres de Mariola, Castalla, Sax, Elda, Petrer or Novelda.

The Vinalopó Valley is dotted with castles and fortifications. It is heritage of the Arab era. The Arabic culture first, and then the Christian, left in these lands a heritage of architectural value.

Itinerary 
The Route of the Castles of Vinalopó the following itinerary, by order:
Atalaya Castle, in Villena
Castle of Banyeres, in Banyeres de Mariola
Castle of Biar, in Biar
Castle of la Mola, en Novelda
Castle de Elda, in Elda
Altamira Palace, in Elche
Castle of Castalla, in Castalla
Castle of Sax, in Sax
Castle of Petrel, in Petrer

See also 
Route of the Monasteries of Valencia
Route of the Borgias
Route of the Valencian classics

References

External links 

Route of the Castles of Vinalopó 
The Route at Spain Tourism website 
The Route at "España es Cultura" 
The Route at the website of Valencian Community Tourism 
Guide in pdf of the Route at Costa Blanca Tourism 
Guide in pdf of Valencian Community Tourism 
Map of the Route
Article about the Route at "Las Provincias" Newspaper 
Guide of the route 

History of the Valencian Community
Castles in the Valencian Community
Tourism in the Valencian Community
Tourist attractions in the Valencian Community
Gothic architecture in the Valencian Community
Cultural tourism in Spain